A muffin or cupcake tray  is a mold in which muffins or cupcakes are baked.

Muffin tins can be made out of aluminum, stainless steel, cast iron, or silicone. In addition, aluminum and stainless steel muffin tins may be coated with Teflon or other non-stick coatings. Historically, galvanized steel has been used for muffin tins but this is no longer common.

See also 
 List of food preparation utensils

References

Cookware and bakeware